O Virgo Splendens ("O Splendid Virgin") is a monodic song (fol. 21v-22) from the Llibre Vermell de Montserrat, one of the oldest extant medieval manuscripts containing music. In modern times it has been recorded by many artists:

 Jordi Savall, Hespèrion XX (album Llibre Vermell de Montserrat - siglo XIV, 1978)
 New London Consort directed by Philip Pickett (album Llibre vermell, pilgrim songs & dances, 1992)
 Ensemble Anonymus (album Llibre vermell, 1993)
 Qntal (album Qntal II, 1995)
 Studio der Frühen Musik directed by Thomas Binkley: "Llibre vermell" (album Secular music c1300, 1998)
 Schelmish (album Codex lascivus, 2002)
 Wolfenmond: "O virgo splendens" (album Wintersturm, 2005)
 Ensemble Rayuela (album Rayuela, 2006)
 Choeur de Chambre de Namur (album Llibre Vermell, 2007)

References

Medieval compositions